The SS Pomona Victory was a Victory ship built during World War II under the Emergency Shipbuilding program. She was launched by the California Shipbuilding Company on April 29, 1944, and completed on July 31, 1944. The ship's United States Maritime Commission designation was 'VC2- S- AP3, hull number 31'. The 10,500-ton Victory ships were designed to replace the earlier Liberty Ships. Liberty ships were designed to be used just for World War II compared to Victory ships, which were designed to last longer and serve the US Navy after the war. Victory ships differed from Liberty ships in that they were faster, longer and wider, taller, had a thinner stack set farther toward the superstructure, and had a long raised forecastle.

Following World War II service, Pomona Victory was sold to Belgium where she served as the SS Tervaete from 1947 to 1965. She was eventually resold to Liberia in 1965 where she served as the SS Hongkong Delegate until she was sunk in a collision with the SS Columbus Canada on October 4, 1975. Deemed beyond repair,  was eventually raised and scrapped on December 15, 1975.

References 

Victory ships
Ships built in Los Angeles
United States Merchant Marine
1944 ships
World War II merchant ships of the United States
Cargo liners